KDBH-FM (97.5 FM, "Country Legends 97.5") is an American radio station broadcasting a classic country music format. Licensed to Natchitoches, Louisiana, United States, the station serves  Natchitoches Parish and surrounding areas from a studio located in Natchitoches, Louisiana.  The station is currently owned by Baldridge-Dumas Communications, Inc. The station broadcasts using the Westwood One Classic Country format.

History
KNOC-FM went on the air in 1965. It broadcast with 3,000 watts at 97.7 MHz and was owned by the Natchitoches Broadcasting Company. The station became KDBH-FM on October 1, 1971.

In 2001, the station was approved for a power increase to 25,000 watts, with a frequency change to 97.3 MHz. It stayed until an agreement was made with Cumulus Media, to downgrade coverage once again to a class A station with 6,000 watts and move to 97.5 MHz, to allow for the positioning of station KQHN FM on 97.3 MHz in the Shreveport, Louisiana radio market; KQHN had been ordered in January 2005 to relocate from 107.9 MHz due to interference to navigational equipment at Barksdale Air Force Base. In 2015, KDBH-FM returned to an upgraded Class C3 facility on 97.5.

On May 1, 2017, KDBH-FM changed their format to classic country, branded as "Country Legends 97.5". (info taken from stationintel.com)

References

External links

Radio stations in Louisiana
Country radio stations in the United States
Natchitoches Parish, Louisiana
Radio stations established in 2001
2001 establishments in Louisiana